Ilanz is a Kreis, or sub-district of Surselva, in the canton of Graubünden (French: Grisons), Switzerland.

Communes
Ilanz contains the following communes, or municipalities:
Castrisch
Falera
Flond
Ilanz
Laax
Ladir
Luven
Pitasch
Riein
Ruschein
Sagogn
Schluein
Schnaus
Sevgein
Valendas
Versam

Geography of Switzerland